NGC 6560 is a spiral galaxy located in the constellation Hercules. It was discovered by Lewis A. Swift on 22 October 1886.

References

External links

Deep Sky Browser - NGC6560

Spiral galaxies
Hercules (constellation)
6560
11117
61381